The Suramula is a river in Khashuri Municipality, and a right tributary of the Ptsa, itself a tributary of the Kura. This river is nourished by rain, snow, and groundwater. It is known to flood in the spring and in autumn, but it lacks water in winter.

This river is polluted with substances like nitrite nitrogen. It once was polluted with excessive amounts of iron, although this problem has since been fixed.

See also

List of rivers of South Ossetia
List of rivers of Georgia

References

External links

Rivers of Georgia (country)